Émile Genest (July 27, 1921 – March 19, 2003) was a Canadian actor.

Career
Born in Quebec City, Quebec, as a young man Genest served with the Royal Canadian Navy during World War II. At war's end, he worked for a time in radio in his hometown before accepting a job with CBC radio  in Montreal where he would eventually become a sportscaster, working in both French and English.

Genest turned to acting and in his early years played a son on the immensely popular French-language radio show, La famille Plouffe and on its follow-up television series. In 1961 he had a significant role in the first of several films for Walt Disney Pictures. The first was Nikki, Wild Dog of the North followed by 1962's Big Red and the following year he was cast in the lead of The Incredible Journey. Moving to Hollywood, Émile Genest went on to play character roles in a variety of films including The Cincinnati Kid (1965), The King's Pirate (1967), In Enemy Country (1968), The Hell with Heroes (1968), and Don't Just Stand There! (1968). His son, Claude, was born in 1963 in Hollywood and too worked as an actor before becoming an ecological activist.

In the early 1960s, Genest turned to performing on television, appearing in a large number of guest roles in a variety of series such as Mission: Impossible, Route 66, Gunsmoke, Combat!, The Rat Patrol, Perry Mason, The Virginian, Ironside and others. Near the end of the 1970s, Genest returned to work in film in Canada. In 1981, he was cast as the head of the family in a four-hour film update of "The Plouffe Family" for which he was nominated for a Genie Award for Best Performance by an Actor in a Supporting Role.

In 2000, at the age of seventy-nine, Émile Genest appeared in his last film, "A Day in a Life" (2000). He died of a heart attack while vacationing in Hallandale Beach, Florida in 2003.

His elder son is Green Party of Canada unelected politician Claude Genest. His second son, Eric Genest, is the Vice President of Group Alta Real Estate, Inc. He is married to Cornelia Huerlimann; they have two children.

Partial filmography
Nikki, Wild Dog of the North (1961) - Jacques Lebeau 
Dubois et fils (1961)
Big Red (1962) - Emile Fornet
Combat! (1962, TV Series) - Emile (the barman) / Henri Fouquet
Rampage (1963) - Schelling
The Incredible Journey (1963) - John Longridge
The Art of Love (1965) - Cesar (uncredited)
The Cincinnati Kid (1965) - Cajun
The Rat Patrol (Commando du désert) : Mathias the lighthouse warden
The King's Pirate (1967) - Captain Mission
 The Scorpio Letters (1967) - Garin
Don't Just Stand There! (1968) - Henri
In Enemy Country (1968) - General Grieux
The Hell with Heroes (1968) - Insp. Bouchard
Kamouraska (1973) - Aubergiste
Us Two (1979) - Le chef de police américain
The Plouffe Family (1981) - Théophile, le pere Plouffe
Frankenstein and Me (1996) - Judge Ewing
A Day in a Life (2000) - George (final film role)

External links

1921 births
2003 deaths
Canadian male film actors
Canadian male television actors
Canadian military personnel of World War II
French Quebecers
Male actors from Quebec City
Canadian expatriates in the United States